Oricola  is a genus of bacteria from the family of Phyllobacteriaceae.

References

Phyllobacteriaceae
Bacteria genera
Monotypic bacteria genera